Edward Kirk Shelmerdine V (born March 8, 1958) is an American stock car racing driver and former championship-winning crew chief for Dale Earnhardt.

Crew chief
After spending his early NASCAR career as an engineer for Hylton Engineering, in 1984 he joined Richard Childress Racing to become the crew chief for Dale Earnhardt. Earnhardt had 46 wins, 142 top 5 finishes, and 246 top 10 finishes with Shelmerdine en route to four championships in 1986, 1987, 1990 and 1991. The pit crew won four consecutive Pit Crew Titles over the next eight years. His accomplishments include being the youngest crew chief to win a NASCAR race, and the youngest crew chief to win a Winston Cup championship. In 1992, he announced he was retiring from his crew chief duties, and embarked on a racing career on his own to pursue his dream of being a driver.

Driving career begins
He started running in the ARCA series in 1993 where he has three career wins. He has since run in all the top levels in NASCAR.  Shelmerdine has run a total of two Craftsman Truck Series races with a best finish of 17th at Bristol in 1995.  He has also run 12 Busch Series races with a best finish of 17th in 1994 at Daytona for Levin Racing.

Cup driving career
Shelmerdine's NASCAR Winston Cup Series career actually started in 1981 in a race at College Station (Texas World Speedway, where owner/driver James Hylton brought out a 2nd car (No. 8) for Shelmerdine to drive. After two laps, he quit and finished 33rd of the 34 cars. His next start would come at Talladega Superspeedway in 1994 for Jimmy Means. Shelmerdine finished 26th in the No. 52 Ford.  He started his own Cup team in 2002 and ran races at Talladega, Loudon and Pocono, but he was primarily a "field filler" driver.

2004 was a breakout year for Shelmerdine, as he attempted all 36 races as an owner, 32 as a driver. As team owner he had other drivers fill in for him at selected tracks: Tom Hubert at Infineon and Watkins Glen, Brad Teague at the fall Bristol race, and Ted Christopher at the July Loudon race. Shelmerdine's best finish would be a 37th at Michigan. His car qualified 18 races but completed none of them.

2005 was a step back. The team qualified for only three races (Infineon with Hubert, Loudon with Christopher, and Pocono with Shelmerdine). Shelmerdine finished 42nd in the Pocono race with heating conditions ending his day 192 laps short of the finish.

He started out 2006 on a better note. He was rolling his car on to his hauler after failing to qualify high enough in his qualifying race for the Daytona 500. A NASCAR official stopped him and informed him that he qualified for his first Daytona 500 by gaining the final spot with his qualifying speed. He finished in 20th place on the lead lap, the best finish of his Cup career. His performance gained media attention as he said if he did not qualify, he'd sell his race team because he was extremely low on money. He was using a motor from Richard Childress (in exchange for a displaying a sponsorship decal). His tires had been donated by a family of Dale Earnhardt fans. He had no full-time pit crew, only his loyal teammates such as Phil Harris, J.V. Daniels and a few others.

Shelmerdine's plans for the rest of 2006 were limited, however, he did race at Talladega. He qualified 22nd and was having a good run when he wrecked early in the race. Shelmerdine finished 40th. Since then, he has attempted to qualify for the Coca-Cola 600 but failed to make the race after a qualifying crash, his next appearance was at the Pepsi 400 at Daytona where he made the show but fell out early and finished 43rd.

On December 22, 2006, the Federal Election Commission sent an "admonishment letter" to Shelmerdine as a response to him for running with a Bush/Cheney decal on his car in 2004.

Shelmerdine drove the Richard Childress Racing No. 33 in the 2008 Daytona testing sessions and was to be entered in the 2008 Daytona 500. He attempted a number of races during the 2009 season after buying Toyotas from Bill Davis Racing. Shelmerdine used Tom Hubert for road courses and New England staple Ted Christopher for Loudon.

It was announced on August 26, 2010, that on September 14, 2010, the assets of Kirk Shelmerdine Racing were to be sold at Public Auction at the team's basis in Welcome, North Carolina. Shelmerdine stated the reason for the closure is lack of sponsorship and technology provided for independent teams.

Personal life
Shelmerdine resides in Welcome, North Carolina, and is the father of two children.

Motorsports career results

NASCAR
(key) (Bold – Pole position awarded by qualifying time. Italics – Pole position earned by points standings or practice time. * – Most laps led.)

Sprint Cup Series

Daytona 500

Nationwide Series

Craftsman Truck Series

ARCA Re/Max Series
(key) (Bold – Pole position awarded by qualifying time. Italics – Pole position earned by points standings or practice time. * – Most laps led.)

References

External links

ESPN.com article on Shelmerdine

1958 births
ARCA Menards Series drivers
NASCAR crew chiefs
Living people
NASCAR drivers
NASCAR team owners
People from Welcome, North Carolina
Racing drivers from Philadelphia
Richard Childress Racing drivers
NASCAR Hall of Fame inductees